Nyssicus quadriguttatus is a species of beetle in the family Cerambycidae. It was described by Swederus in 1787.

References

Elaphidiini
Beetles described in 1787